Zakat or Zakāt also Zakat al-mal, is a form of alms-giving and religious tax in Islam. It may also refer to
Zakāt Livestock, Zakāt on livestock or cattle
Zakat Council, a government body responsible for collecting and distributing Zakat in Pakistan
International Zakat Organization, an Islamic charitable initiative founded by the Government of Malaysia, which focuses on the use of Zakat
The Zakat Foundation, a Chicago-based, Muslim non-profit organization
Zakat al-Fitr, a smaller Islamic charitable donation given on Eid al-Fitr

See also
Zagat